Carolus Maria Joannes Franciscus (Carel) Goseling (10 June 1891, Amsterdam – 14 April 1941, Buchenwald) was a Dutch lawyer and politician for the Roman Catholic State Party (RKSP).

Goseling was a member of the House of Representatives from 1929 to 1937 and subsequently Minister of Justice from 1937 to 1939.

He died aged 49 in Buchenwald concentration camp.

Decorations 
 Knight of the Order of the Netherlands Lion

References 
  Biography at the Institute for Netherlands History

1891 births
1941 deaths
Dutch people who died in Buchenwald concentration camp
Lawyers from Amsterdam
Dutch people of World War II
Dutch Roman Catholics
Knights of the Order of the Netherlands Lion
Members of the House of Representatives (Netherlands)
Ministers of Justice of the Netherlands
Politicians from Amsterdam
Roman Catholic State Party politicians
20th-century Dutch politicians
University of Amsterdam alumni
Dutch civilians killed in World War II
20th-century Dutch lawyers